WZ Cassiopeiae (WZ Cas) is a deep red hued star in the northern constellation of Cassiopeia. It is a variable star with a magnitude that ranges from 6.3 down to 8.8, placing it near the limit of naked eye visibility at peak magnitude. It is moving closer to the Earth with a heliocentric radial velocity of −34 km/s.

This is an aging carbon star on the asymptotic giant branch. This is a semiregular variable of subtype SRb with periods of 186 and 366 days due to radial pulsations. It has expanded to around 600 times the Sun's radius and is radiating 12,400 times the Sun's luminosity from its photosphere at a relatively cool effective temperature of 3,095 K.

The difference in the radial velocities for the two stars – 20 km/s – is too large for them to be dynamically associated.

References

Carbon stars
Semiregular variable stars
Cassiopeia (constellation)
Durchmusterung objects
224855
000099
Cassiopeiae, WZ